Iostephane is a genus of Mexican flowering plants in the family Asteraceae.

The species are rosette-forming herbaceous perennials that produce relatively large heads with yellow or purple (I. heterophylla) rays.  They have large, somewhat quadrate cypselae (achenes), that may either have or lack a pappus.  Molecular phylogenetic studies  suggested that there is an unexpectedly close relationship between Iostephane and Dendroviguiera  (Viguiera sect. Maculatae), a genus of shrubs and trees that is also endemic to Mexico.

 Species
 Iostephane heterophylla (Cav.) Benth. - widespread from Chihuahua to Oaxaca
 Iostephane madrensis (S.Wats.) Strother - Chihuahua
 Iostephane papposa J. J. Fay - Oaxaca
 Iostephane trilobata Hemsl. - 	Chiapas, Oaxaca, Puebla, México State

References

Heliantheae
Endemic flora of Mexico
Asteraceae genera